is a town located in Kitakatsuragi District, Nara Prefecture, Japan.

As of March 31, 2017, the town has an estimated population of 22,807. The total area is 6.14 km².

Geography
Located in northwestern Nara Prefecture, the town is slightly hilly. Only a small portion of the town is used for agriculture. It is about 25 km apart from Nara City and 25 km from Osaka city.

Surrounding municipalities
 Nara Prefecture
 Kashiba
 Kawai
 Kōryō
 Ōji

Education
 Primary Schools
 Kanmaki Elementary School
 Kanmaki Daini Elementary School
 Kanmaki Daisan Elementary School
 Junior High Schools
 Kanmaki Junior High School
 Kanmaki Daini Junior High School
 Special Schools
 Nishiwa School

References

External links

 Kanmaki official website 

Towns in Nara Prefecture